The 2nd constituency of Lot-et-Garonne (French: Deuxième circonscription de Lot-et-Garonne) is a French legislative constituency in the Lot-et-Garonne département. Like the other 576 French constituencies, it elects one MP using a two round electoral system.

Description
The 2nd Constituency of Lot-et-Garonne covers the north west portion of the Department. Politically since 1988 the seat has swung between the mainstream left and right broadly in line with the national trend. In common with the other two seats in the department it voted for the En Marche candidate at the 2017 election. That election featured a strong performance by the National Front whereby their candidate secured 2nd place in the 1st round of voting and over 40% in the run off.

Assembly members

Election results

2022

2017

 
 
 
 
 
 
 
|-
| colspan="8" bgcolor="#E9E9E9"|
|-

2012

 
 
 
 
 
|-
| colspan="8" bgcolor="#E9E9E9"|
|-

References

2